In mathematics, especially in order theory, a preorder or quasiorder is a binary relation that is reflexive and transitive. Preorders are more general than equivalence relations and (non-strict) partial orders, both of which are special cases of a preorder: an antisymmetric (or skeletal) preorder is a partial order, and a symmetric preorder is an equivalence relation.

The name  comes from the idea that preorders (that are not partial orders) are 'almost' (partial) orders, but not quite; they are neither necessarily antisymmetric nor asymmetric.  Because a preorder is a binary relation, the symbol  can be used as the notational device for the relation.  However, because they are not necessarily antisymmetric, some of the ordinary intuition associated to the symbol  may not apply.  On the other hand, a preorder can be used, in a straightforward fashion, to define a partial order and an equivalence relation.  Doing so, however, is not always useful or worthwhile, depending on the problem domain being studied.

In words, when  one may say that b  a or that a  b, or that b  to a.

To every preorder, there corresponds a directed graph, with elements of the set corresponding to vertices, and the order relation between pairs of elements corresponding to the directed edges between vertices. The converse is not true: most directed graphs are neither reflexive nor transitive. In general, the corresponding graphs may contain cycles.  A preorder that is antisymmetric no longer has cycles; it is a partial order, and corresponds to a directed acyclic graph.  A preorder that is symmetric is an equivalence relation; it can be thought of as having lost the direction markers on the edges of the graph.  In general, a preorder's corresponding directed graph may have many disconnected components.

Formal definition

Reflexivity:  for all  and
Transitivity: if  for all  

A set that is equipped with a preorder is called a preordered set (or proset). 
For emphasis or contrast to strict preorders, a preorder may also be referred to as a non-strict preorder. 

Transitivity: if  for all 

A binary relation is a strict preorder if and only if it is a strict partial order. By definition, a strict partial order is an asymmetric strict preorder, where  is called  if  for all  Conversely, every strict preorder is a strict partial order because every transitive irreflexive relation is necessarily asymmetric. 
Although they are equivalent, the term "strict partial order" is typically preferred over "strict preorder" and readers are referred to the article on strict partial orders for details about such relations.

Related definitions 

If a preorder is also antisymmetric, that is,  and  implies  then it is a partial order.

On the other hand, if it is symmetric, that is, if  implies  then it is an equivalence relation.

The notion of a preordered set  can be formulated in a categorical framework as a thin category; that is, as a category with at most one morphism from an object to another. Alternately, a preordered set can be understood as an enriched category, enriched over the category 

A preordered class is a class equipped with a preorder. Every set is a class and so every preordered set is a preordered class.

Examples

Graph theory 
 (see figure above) By x//4 is meant the greatest integer that is less than or equal to x divided by 4, thus 1//4 is 0, which is certainly less than or equal to 0, which is itself the same as 0//4.

 The reachability relationship in any directed graph (possibly containing cycles) gives rise to a preorder, where  in the preorder if and only if there is a path from x to y in the directed graph. Conversely, every preorder is the reachability relationship of a directed graph (for instance, the graph that has an edge from x to y for every pair  with  However, many different graphs may have the same reachability preorder as each other. In the same way, reachability of directed acyclic graphs, directed graphs with no cycles, gives rise to partially ordered sets (preorders satisfying an additional antisymmetry property).
 The graph-minor relation in graph theory.

Computer science 
In computer science, one can find examples of the following preorders.
 Asymptotic order causes a preorder over  functions . The corresponding equivalence relation is called asymptotic equivalence.
 Polynomial-time, many-one (mapping) and Turing reductions are preorders on complexity classes.
 Subtyping relations are usually preorders.
 Simulation preorders are preorders (hence the name).
 Reduction relations in abstract rewriting systems.
 The encompassment preorder on the set of terms, defined by  if a subterm of t is a substitution instance of s.
 Theta-subsumption, which is when the literals in a disjunctive first-order formula are contained by another, after applying a substitution to the former.

Other 
Further examples:
 Every finite topological space gives rise to a preorder on its points by defining  if and only if x belongs to every neighborhood of y. Every finite preorder can be formed as the specialization preorder of a topological space in this way. That is, there is a one-to-one correspondence between finite topologies and finite preorders. However, the relation between infinite topological spaces and their specialization preorders is not one-to-one.

 A net is a directed preorder, that is, each pair of elements has an upper bound.  The definition of convergence via nets is important in topology, where preorders cannot be replaced by partially ordered sets without losing important features.

 The relation defined by  if  where f is a function into some preorder.
 The relation defined by  if there exists some injection from x to y. Injection may be replaced by surjection, or any type of structure-preserving function, such as ring homomorphism, or permutation.
 The embedding relation for countable total orderings.
 A category with at most one morphism from any object x to any other object y is a preorder. Such categories are called thin.  In this sense, categories "generalize" preorders by allowing more than one relation between objects: each morphism is a distinct (named) preorder relation.

Example of a total preorder:
 Preference, according to common models.

Uses
Preorders play a pivotal role in several situations:
 Every preorder can be given a topology, the Alexandrov topology; and indeed, every preorder on a set is in one-to-one correspondence with an Alexandrov topology on that set.
 Preorders may be used to define interior algebras.
 Preorders provide the Kripke semantics for certain types of modal logic.
 Preorders are used in forcing in set theory to prove consistency and independence results.

Constructions

Left residual preorder induced by a binary relation

Preorders and partial orders on partitions

Given a preorder  on  one may define an equivalence relation  on  such that 
 
The resulting relation  is reflexive since the preorder  is reflexive; transitive by applying the transitivity of  twice; and symmetric by definition. 

Using this relation, it is possible to construct a partial order on the quotient set of the equivalence,  which is the set of all equivalence classes of  If the preorder is denoted by  then  is the set of -cycle equivalence classes: 
In any case, on  it is possible to define  if and only if  

Conversely, from any partial order on a partition of a set  it is possible to construct a preorder on  itself. There is a one-to-one correspondence between preorders and pairs (partition, partial order).

: Let  be a formal theory, which is a set of sentences with certain properties (details of which can be found in the article on the subject). For instance,  could be a first-order theory (like Zermelo–Fraenkel set theory) or a simpler zeroth-order theory.
The relation  is a preorder on  because  always holds and whenever  and  both hold then so does  
Furthermore, for any   if and only if ; that is, two sentences are equivalent with respect to  if and only if they are logically equivalent.
All that has been said of  so far can also be said of its converse relation  
The preordered set  is a directed set because if  and if  denotes the sentence formed by logical conjunction  then  and  where  The partially ordered set  is consequently also a directed set. 
See Lindenbaum–Tarski algebra for a related example.

Preorders and strict preorders

Strict preorder induced by a preorder

Given a preorder  a new relation  can be defined by declaring that  if and only if  
Using the equivalence relation  introduced above,  if and only if  
and so the following holds

The relation  is a strict partial order and  strict partial order can be constructed this way. 
 the preorder  is antisymmetric (and thus a partial order) then the equivalence  is equality (that is,  if and only if ) and so in this case, the definition of  can be restated as: 

But importantly, this new condition is  used as (nor is it equivalent to) the general definition of the relation  (that is,  is  defined as:  if and only if ) because if the preorder  is not antisymmetric then the resulting relation  would not be transitive (consider how equivalent non-equal elements relate). 
This is the reason for using the symbol "" instead of the "less than or equal to" symbol "", which might cause confusion for a preorder that is not antisymmetric since it might misleadingly suggest that  implies  

Preorders induced by a strict preorder

Using the construction above, multiple non-strict preorders can produce the same strict preorder  so without more information about how  was constructed (such knowledge of the equivalence relation  for instance), it might not be possible to reconstruct the original non-strict preorder from  Possible (non-strict) preorders that induce the given strict preorder  include the following:
The resulting preorder is connected (formerly called total); that is, a total preorder.

If  then  
The converse holds (that is) if and only if whenever  then  or

Number of preorders

As explained above, there is a 1-to-1 correspondence between preorders and pairs (partition, partial order). Thus the number of preorders is the sum of the number of partial orders on every partition. For example:

Interval
For  the interval  is the set of points x satisfying  and  also written  It contains at least the points a and b. One may choose to extend the definition to all pairs  The extra intervals are all empty.

Using the corresponding strict relation "", one can also define the interval  as the set of points x satisfying  and  also written  An open interval may be empty even if 

Also  and  can be defined similarly.

See also
 Partial order – preorder that is antisymmetric
 Equivalence relation – preorder that is symmetric
 Total preorder – preorder that is total
 Total order – preorder that is antisymmetric and total
 Directed set
 Category of preordered sets
 Prewellordering
 Well-quasi-ordering

Notes

References

 Schmidt, Gunther, "Relational Mathematics", Encyclopedia of Mathematics and its Applications, vol. 132, Cambridge University Press, 2011, 
 

Binary relations
Order theory